Pseudis paradoxa, known as the paradoxical frog or shrinking frog, is a species of hylid frog from South America. Although the recordholder was a tadpole in Amapá that belonged to this species, others in the genus Pseudis also have large tadpoles and ordinary-sized adults.

Distribution and habitat
The species inhabits ponds, lakes, lagoons and similar waters from the Amazon and the Guianas, to Venezuela and Trinidad, with a disjunct distribution in the Magdalena River watershed in Colombia and adjacent far western Venezuela. More southerly populations from the Pantanal region to northeastern Argentina have been recognized as a subspecies, but are now often considered a full species, P. platensis, although the validity of this split is questionable.

Appearance and behavior

The female of P. paradoxa lay eggs among water plants; the eggs develop into tadpoles. They always reach a large size, but there are noticeable local variations in the final size of the tadpoles, with those in large temporary waters with plenty of food and few aquatic predators growing larger than those in smaller waters with less food or waters with more aquatic predators.

The tadpoles feed mostly on algae. The adult frogs, which are active both day and night and always in or near water, eat insects (such as flies, beetles, true bugs, plantsuckers, butterflies, moths and dragonflies) and other invertebrates (such as crabs), and small frogs. When threatened, the frog uses its strong toes with an extra joint to stir up the muddy bottom and hide. The frog also uses this mechanism to find food on the bottom of lakes and ponds.

Potential use in medicine
In March 2008, scientists working from the Universities of Ulster and United Arab Emirates released findings of a study on pseudin-2, a skin compound which protects the paradoxical frog from infection. This work found that a synthetic version of this compound was able to stimulate the secretion of insulin in pancreatic cells under laboratory conditions without toxicity to the cells. As such, this synthetic medicine could be used in the treatment of Type 2 diabetes.

References

External links
 
 

Amphibians of Bolivia
Amphibians of Brazil
Amphibians of Colombia
Amphibians of French Guiana
Amphibians of Guyana
Amphibians of Peru
Amphibians of Suriname
Amphibians of Trinidad and Tobago
Amphibians of Venezuela
Amphibians described in 1758
Taxa named by Carl Linnaeus
paradoxa